Shana Elizabeth Dowdeswell (1 April 1989 – 12 December 2012), was a Hollywood actress of Zimbabwean descent.

Personal life
Dowdeswell was born on 1 April 1989 in Harare, Zimbabwe. Her father Roger Dowdeswell is a former professional tennis player. Her mother Laurie Smith is a film producer who produced the film The New Twenty. Shana moved to New York City, United States and attended City and Country School, PS 3, and finally PPAS High School. She started acting career at age eight, and later played Anne Frank in a production at the Paper Mill Playhouse.

She had a longtime relationship with her boyfriend Cameron Moneo. She had one younger brother, Jesse.

Shana's uncle Colin Dowdeswell is also a former professional tennis player.

Death
On 7 December 2012, Shana went to a New York City Greenwich Village bar, called The Basement and drank several shots of whiskey. While returning, she stumbled and passed out on the doorstep. A dog walker discovered her unconscious body and rushed to Beth Israel Medical Center. After the test, it was found she had a blood alcohol content of 0.39 at the time, five times the state's legal limit for driving. She died on 12 December 2012.

Career
In 2002, Shana appeared in the Frank Higgins' play Miracles and played the role of 'Eve', an autistic girl. In 2003 she played the role as young version of 'Jenna' in the film 13 Going on 30. However, her acting was cut from the film after test audiences reacted negatively to the original. She later played four different characters in all three primary shows of the Law & Order franchise. Then she acted in the popular television serials such as Mercy, Family of the Year, and Body of Proof. Meanwhile, Shana also appeared in the film The Stream, The Winning Season, Asylum Seekers, and Choose before her death.

After her death in 2012, five films were released: The Big Wedding (2013), a short film Going South (2013), An Ornament of Faith (2013), short film Wish You Were Here (2013), and Mistress America (2015).

Filmography

References

External links
 

Living people
21st-century Zimbabwean actresses
Zimbabwean film actresses
South African actresses
1989 births